Nachtjagdgeschwader 100 (NJG 100) was a Luftwaffe night fighter-wing of World War II. The Geschwader did not have a Stab and no Geschwaderkommodore. It had two Gruppen (groups), operating separately. The I. Gruppe of NJG 100 was formed in early 1943 from the II.(Eis)/Nachtjagdgeschwader 5 while II. Gruppe was formed in July 1944 from three Staffeln of Nachtjagdgeschwader 200.

Commanding officers

Gruppenkommandeure

I. Gruppe of NJG 100
Major Heinrich Prinz zu Sayn-Wittgenstein, 1 August 1943 – 5 August 1943
Major Rudolf Schoenert, 5 August 1943 – 31 December 1943

II. Gruppe of NJG 100
Major Paul Zorner, 20 July 1944 – 8 May 1945

External links
 References to the Nachtjagdgeschwader in European newspapers

References

Citations

Bibliography

 
 

Luftwaffe Wings
Military units and formations established in 1943
Military units and formations disestablished in 1945